Hyenas or hyaenas are the animals of the family Hyaenidae.

Hyena, hyaena or The Hyena may also refer to:

Characters
 The Hyena (Boner's Ark), from the comic strip Boner's Ark
 Hyena (comics), two villains in the DC Comics universe
 Hyena (Gargoyles), from the Disney cartoon Gargoyles (1994–96)
 Hyena (The King of Fighters: Maximum Impact), in the 2004 fighting video game The King of Fighters: Maximum Impact

Film and television
 Hyenas (1992 film), also Hyènes, Senegalese film by Djibril Diop Mambéty based on Dürrenmatt's "Besuch der alten Dame"
 Hyenas (2011 film), a supernatural horror film, written and directed by Eric Weston
 Hyena (film), a British film
 Hyena Filmproduktion, a film company founded by Monika Treut and Elfi Mikesch in 1984
 Hyena (TV series), a 2020 South Korean legal drama television series
 La hiena (The Hyena), 1971 Mexican telenovela

People
 Seo Hyena, also known as Ida Daussy, a French-born South Korean broadcaster
 HYENA, Swedish songwriter

Military
 HMS Hyaena, four ships of the Royal Navy
 de Havilland Hyena, a prototype British army co-operation aircraft of the 1920s
 Armstrong Siddeley Hyena, a British aero engine developed by Armstrong Siddeley in the 1930s

Music
 , a record label founded by American jazz and R&B music producer Joel Dorn
 Hyæna, a 1984 album by Siouxsie and the Banshees
 Hyëna, a 2022 album by KMFDM
 Hyena (soundtrack), the soundtrack album of 2006 South Korean television series Hyena
 Hyena, a 2014 album by Red Snapper
 "Hyena" (song), a 2007 Japanese single by The Gazette from the album Stacked Rubbish
 "Hyena", a song by R.E.M. from the 1986 album Lifes Rich Pageant
 "Hyenas", a song by Noisia from the 2014 compilation album FabricLive.76

Literature
 "The Hyena" (short story), 1962 short story by Paul Bowles
 "The Hyena", 1928 short story by Robert E. Howard

Other uses
 Lancia Hyena, a small sports car introduced in 1992
 Hyena, a southern Malawi occupation for providing sexual cleansing services

See also
 Iota Draconis, a star in the Draco constellation also known as "Al dhili" (male hyena, in Arabic)
 Le Iene (The Hyenas), a television program broadcast on the Italian channel Italia 1 that began in 1996
 Jorge Rodrigo Barrios (born 1976), Argentine junior lightweight boxer known as La Hiena (The Hyena)
 Julius Jacob von Haynau (1786–1853), Austrian general known as "The Hyena of Brescia"